Mount Wilson is the highest summit of the San Miguel Mountains range of the Rocky Mountains of North America. Mount Wilson should not to be confused with the lower Wilson Peak nearby.

The peak was named for A.D. Wilson, a topographer with the Hayden Survey.  He was in the first ascent party, which climbed the peak on September 13, 1874, via the south ridge (a difficult route, not often climbed today).

Climbing
Mount Wilson is ranked among the top ten hardest of the Colorado fourteeners to climb. The standard climbing route ascends the North Face from Navajo Basin. Some permanent snowfields exist high in the basin (sometimes termed "Navajo Glacier") and the climb usually involves snow travel, with ice axe and crampons recommended. Scrambling on rock then leads to the summit.

A popular, though long, outing for expert climbers is the mile-long ridge connecting Mount Wilson to El Diente Peak. The ridge is sharp and rocky, and requires difficult scrambling and often a small amount of rappelling.

Geology and history
Mount Wilson, and the rest of the San Miguel Mountains, are made up of a large, irregular tertiary igneous intrusion.

The Mount Wilson region became the site of intense mining activity, particularly for silver, in the early 1880s. The most famous of these mines was the Silver Pick Mine, which gave its name to Silver Pick Basin, just north of Navajo Basin.

Glaciers and permafrost
Mount Wilson contains four small glaciers on its summit, these being the southernmost modern glaciers in the Rocky Mountains and indeed the most southerly in the contiguous US outside the Sierra Nevada in California. None of the glaciers have ever been named, and it has never been investigated whether they are presently active.

During the Pleistocene glaciers were much more extensive than today, covering the whole summit plateau In glaciations previous to the Wisconsinian, it is generally thought that summit ice caps were even more extensive and joined to form the "San Miguel Glacier" with icecaps in the San Juan Mountains.

Historical names
 Glacier Mountain
 Mount Wilson – 1906

See also

List of mountain peaks of North America
List of mountain peaks of the United States
List of mountain peaks of Colorado
List of Colorado county high points
List of Colorado fourteeners

Notes

References

External links

 Mt. Wilson on 14ers.com
 Photo Journal from a trip up Mount Wilson and El Diente

Fourteeners of Colorado
Wilson
San Juan Mountains (Colorado)
Wilson
San Juan National Forest
Wilson